was a Japanese samurai and commander of the Sengoku period.

Hirozumi's relative Saka Hirohide rebelled against Mōri Motonari, as Hirohide was dissatisfied with Motonari's succession to the family headship. However, the rebellion ended in failure . 
He took responsibility for the conflict and committed seppuku, even though Motonari never pursued for his responsibility for the matter. His son Katsura Motozumi became one of the most important retainers of the Mōri clan. Motozumi served Motonari and Mōri Terumoto until his death.

References

Samurai
1524 deaths
Mōri clan
Suicides by seppuku